Cats in Space (styled CATS in SPACE - The Band) is a British rock band formed in Horsham, West Sussex in 2015 by guitarist Greg Hart and drummer Steevi Bacon.  Following the band's inception, vocalist Paul Manzi, keyboardist Andy Stewart, bassist Jeff Brown and second guitarist Dean Howard were recruited to complete the official lineup. In mid-2019, vocalist Paul Manzi announced that he would be leaving the band to join The Sweet after the first half of ‘The Narnia Tour’. Soon after Manzi’s departure from the band, Mark Pascall joined the band as their new lead vocalist. After a tour the band parted ways with Pascall. He was then replaced by Jeff Wayne's War of the Worlds stage show vocalist Damien Edwards.

History 
Cats in Space began to work on their debut album Too Many Gods. The recording sessions had guest vocal appearances by both key songwriter Greg Hart's fellow co-writer Mick Wilson of 10cc, as well as a guitar/vocal session by Andy Scott of The Sweet.

The band released their first single from the album on 24 August 2015 via YouTube, named "Mr. Heartache."

Cats in Space announced their second album, the follow-up to critically acclaimed debut album Too Many Gods, titled Scarecrow, with an official release date of 25 August 2017.

Track two, "The Mad Hatter's Tea Party" (which the band had previously showcased on the 2017 Thunder support tour) was released on 21 July 2017 as a music promo on YouTube,  both albums were then announced as digitally available in their entirety on all the reputable digital media platform outlets.

Tours and shows
Cats in Space made their debut appearance at London's The Half Moon, Putney SW15 on Wednesday 6 January 2016. They made subsequent appearances leading them to accept their fourth show at the Stone Free Festival on Sunday 19 June 2016.  

Their fifth performance was at The Ramblin' Man Fair, on the new Rising Stage at Mote Park, Maidstone, Kent on 24 July 2016. The lineup featured many classic rock bands including Whitesnake, Europe, Thin Lizzy, Thunder, Airbourne and Black Stone Cherry.

Thunder UK Tour March 2017

December 2016, UK rock band Thunder announced that a studio album entitled Rip It Up would be released on 10 February 2017. This would also coincide with a number of live dates. Cats in Space were confirmed on 23 January 2017 as the official UK tour support.  

British Summer Time (BST) Hyde Park, London, UK

Monday 27 March, Cats in Space were added to the Phil Collins BST Hyde Park concert line-up. The concert took place on Friday 30 June 2017.

Fairport Cropredy Convention 2017

12 August 2017, the band played a one-hour set to an over 20,000 plus capacity at the Fairport's Cropredy Convention in Oxfordshire.

Deep Purple Long Goodbye UK Tour 2017

An announcement was made onstage on the final night of the Scarecrow headline tour, that Cats in Space had been added to the whole UK leg of the Deep Purple 2017 arena tour  along with Europe.

Status Quo - Plugged in Live and Rockin' Winter UK Tour 2017

Cats in Space announced as special guests on the Status Quo Plugged In Live and Rockin'  nine date UK winter tour of November/December 2017.

Bonnie Tyler - The London Palladium, UK 2019

Cats in Space were special guests to Bonnie Tyler - Wednesday 18 September 2019  at The London Palladium, Argyll Street, London UK

Blue Öyster Cult - UK Tour 2022

Cats in Space were special guests to Blue Öyster Cult Tuesday 18 October 2022 at the De Montfort Hall, Leicester, UK, and Wednesday 19 October 2022 at City Hall, Newcastle, UK

Members

Current

 Damien Edwards – Lead vocals / backing vocals
 Greg Hart – guitars / backing vocals
 Steevi Bacon – drums / percussion
 Dean Howard – guitars
 Jeff Brown – bass guitar / backing vocals
 Andy Stewart – piano / keyboards / synths
 Mick Wilson – co-lead vocals/backing vocals and additional instrumentation

Former 

 Paul Manzi
 Mark Pascall

Discography

Studio albums
 Too Many Gods (31 October 2015, Harmony Factory Records)
 Scarecrow (25 August 2017, Harmony Factory Records)
 Day Trip To Narnia (1 March 2019, Harmony Factory Records)
 My Kind of Christmas (6 December 2019)
 Atlantis (27 November 2020)
 Kickstart the Sun (29 July 2022)

Live albums
 Cats Alive! (23 February 2018, Harmony Factory Records)

References

External links
 Official site

English rock music groups
Musical groups from West Sussex